Shakhtyor Prokopyevsk may refer to the following teams based or formerly based in Prokopyevsk, Kemerovo Oblast, Russia:
 FC Shakhtyor Prokopyevsk, an association football club
 HC Shakhtyor Prokopyevsk, an ice hockey club